Camilla Rodolfi (fl. 1449) was the commander of a group of women who came together to fight against Francesco Sforza.

Biography 
Rodolfi was a member of the highly regarded Rodolfi merchant family, which was one of the principal governing families of Vigevano and was a mercenary soldier. Her dates of birth and death are unknown, but it is known that she was most influential in Italy in 1449. When Francesco Sforza tried to take Vigevano in April 1449, Rodolfi and a group of women fought back after many men had died trying. Despite the women's attempt, Sforza still captured the city, but some sources suggest that sometimes he liked to have Camilla Rodolfi and her army parade around in full uniform.

References 

Year of birth missing
Year of death missing
People from Vigevano
15th-century condottieri
Women in war in Italy
Women in 15th-century warfare
15th-century Italian women